Kęstutis Šapka (born 15 November 1949) is a retired Lithuanian high jumper who represented the Soviet Union. He was inspired to become a professional high jumper after the 1968 Summer Olympics in Mexico and became one of the early adopters of Fosbury Flop. He retired due to recurring injuries. After retiring from competitions he worked as a trainer in Vilnius. In 2007, he was ranked as top 16 trainer in track and field athletics.

Achievements

References

1949 births
Living people
Lithuanian male high jumpers
Soviet male high jumpers
Athletes (track and field) at the 1972 Summer Olympics
Olympic athletes of the Soviet Union
Lithuanian athletics coaches
European Athletics Championships medalists
Sportspeople from Vilnius